Gundary is a locality in Goulburn Mulwaree Council in New South Wales, Australia. Its land is largely used for grazing, but it includes rural residential.

References

Goulburn Mulwaree Council
Localities in New South Wales
Southern Tablelands